Bad Berleburg station is a railway station in the municipality of Bad Berleburg, located in the Siegen-Wittgenstein district in North Rhine-Westphalia, Germany.

References

Railway stations in North Rhine-Westphalia
Buildings and structures in Siegen-Wittgenstein